Sir Henry Gawdy (c. 1553 – 1621), of Claxton, Norfolk, was an English politician.

He was the eldest son of Sir Thomas Gawdy and was educated at Trinity College, Cambridge (1571) and the Inner Temple (1571). He succeeded his father in 1588.

Gawdy served as a Justice of the Peace for Suffolk from 1593 and was appointed High Sheriff of Norfolk for 1592–93 and 1607–08. He was elected a Member of Parliament for Norfolk in 1597 and 1601 and was knighted in 1603.

He married twice: firstly Elizabeth, the daughter of Robert Warner of Norwich, with whom he had six sons and a daughter, and secondly Elizabeth Barnardiston, widow of Sir Charles Framlingham. He was succeeded by his son Robert.

References

1550s births
1621 deaths
People from South Norfolk (district)
Alumni of Trinity College, Cambridge
English MPs 1597–1598
English MPs 1601
High Sheriffs of Norfolk
Members of the Parliament of England for Norfolk